Cornelia Ann Parker  (born 14 July 1956) is an English visual artist, best known for her sculpture and installation art.

Life and career
Parker was born in 1956 in Cheshire, England. She studied at the Gloucestershire College of Art and Design (1974–75) and Wolverhampton Polytechnic (1975–78). She received her MFA from Reading University in 1982 and honorary doctorates from the University of Wolverhampton in 2000, the University of Birmingham (2005), the University of Gloucestershire (2008) and the University of Manchester (2017).

In 1997, Parker was shortlisted for the Turner Prize along with Christine Borland, Angela Bulloch, and Gillian Wearing (who won the prize). Parker is currently Honorary Professor at the University of Manchester and between 2016 and 2019 was Visiting Fellow at Lady Margaret Hall Oxford. She was appointed Honorary Fellow at Trinity Hall, Cambridge in 2020.

Parker is married, has one daughter, and lives and works in London. Parker's mother was German and was a nurse in the Luftwaffe during the Second World War. Her British grandfather fought in the Battle of the Somme in the First World War.

Cornelia Parker's first solo museum exhibition was at the Institute of Contemporary Art Boston in 2000. A survey exhibition of her work opened at Tate Britain in May 2022.

Work

Parker is best known for large-scale installations such as Cold Dark Matter: An Exploded View (1991) – first shown at the Chisenhale Gallery in Bow, East London – for which she had a garden shed blown up by the British Army and suspended the fragments as if suspending the explosion process in time. In the centre was a light which cast the shadows of the wood dramatically on the walls of the room. This inspired an orchestral composition of the same name by Joo Yeon Sir.

In contrast, in 1997 at the Turner Prize exhibition, Parker exhibited Mass (Colder Darker Matter) (1997), suspending the charred remains of a church that had been struck by lightning in Texas. Eight years later, Parker made a companion piece "Anti-Mass" (2005), using charcoal from a black congregation church in Kentucky, which had been destroyed by arson. Hanging Fire (Suspected Arson) (1999) is another example of Parker’s suspended sculptures, featuring charred remains of an actual case of suspected arson.

The Maybe (1995) at the Serpentine Gallery, London, was a performance piece conceived by Tilda Swinton, who lay, apparently asleep, inside a vitrine. She asked Parker to collaborate with her on the project, and to create an installation in which she could sleep. Swinton's original idea was to lie in state as Snow White in a glass coffin, but through the collaboration with Cornelia the idea evolved into her appearing as herself and not as an actor posing as a fictional character.  Parker filled the Serpentine with glass cases containing relics that belonged to famous historical figures, such as the pillow and blanket from Freud's couch, Mrs. Simpson's ice skates, Charles Dickens' quill pen and Queen Victoria's stocking. A version of the piece was later re-performed in Rome (1996) and then MoMA, New York (2013) without Parker's involvement.

Parker has made other interventions involving historical artworks. For example, she wrapped Rodin's The Kiss sculpture in Tate Britain with a mile of string (2003) as her contribution to the 2003 Tate Triennial Days Like These at Tate Britain. The intervention was titled The Distance (A Kiss With String Attached). She re-staged this intervention as part of her mid-career retrospective at the Whitworth Art Gallery, Manchester, in 2015. Subconscious of a Monument (2005) is composed of fragments of dry soil, which are suspended on wires from the gallery ceiling. These lumps are the now-desiccated clay which was removed from beneath the Leaning Tower of Pisa in order to prevent its collapse.

Avoided Object is the title of an ongoing series of smaller works which have been developed in liaison with various institutions, including the Royal Armouries, British Police Forces and Madame Tussauds. These "avoided" objects have often had their identities transformed by being burned, shot, squashed, stretched, drawn, exploded, cut, or simply dropped off cliffs.  Cartoon deaths have long held a fascination for Parker: "Tom being run over by a steamroller or Jerry riddled with bullet holes. Sometimes the object's demise has been orchestrated, or it may have occurred accidentally or by natural causes. They might be 'preempted' objects that have not yet achieved a fully formed identity, having been plucked prematurely from the production line like Embryo Firearms 1995. They may not even be classified as objects: things like cracks, creases, shadows, dust or dirt The Negative of Whispers 1997: Earplugs made with fluff gathered in the Whispering Gallery, St Paul's Cathedral). Or they might be those territories you want to avoid psychologically, such as the backs, underbellies or tarnished surfaces of things."

Another example of this work is Pornographic Drawings (1997),  using ink made by the artist who used solvent to dissolve (pornographic) video tape, confiscated by HM Customs and Excise.

In 2009, for the opening of Jupiter Artland, a sculpture park near Edinburgh, Parker created a firework display titled Nocturne: A Moon Landing containing a lunar meteorite. Therefore, the moon "landed on Jupiter". The following year Parker made Landscape with Gun and Tree for Jupiter Artland, a nine metre tall cast iron and Corten steel shotgun leaning against a tree. Inspired by the painting "Mr and Mrs Andrews" by Thomas Gainsborough where Mr Andrews poses with a gun slung over his arm. The shotgun used in the piece is a facsimile of the one owned by Robert Wilson, one of the founders of Jupiter Artland.

For the Folkestone Triennial in 2011, Parker created a Folkestone version of one of the popular tourist attractions in Copenhagen, Little Mermaid. Through a process of open submission, Parker chose Georgina Baker, mother of two and Folkestone born and bred. Unlike the idealised Copenhagen version, this is a life-size, life-cast sculpture, celebrating the local and the everyday. Parker's mermaid.

To celebrate the 800th anniversary of Magna Carta, Parker created Magna Carta (An Embroidery), a hand embroidered representation of the Wikipedia article Magna Carta as it was on 15 June 2014, completed in 2015. Embroiderers included members of the Embroiderers Guild, HM prisoners, Peers, MP's, judges, human rights lawyers, a US ambassador and his staff, and various personalities including Edward Snowden, Julian Assange, Jimmy Wales, Jarvis Cocker and Doreen Lawrence.

Whilst Magna Carta (An Embroidery) was on display at the British Library, Parker presented One More Time, a Terrace Wires commission for St Pancras International Station, London, co-presented by HS1 Ltd. and the Royal Academy of Arts.

In 2016 Parker became the first female artist to be commissioned to create a new work for the Roof Garden of the Met in New York. Transitional Object (PsychoBarn) is a scaled down replica of the house from the 1960 Hitchcock film “Psycho” and was constructed using a salvaged red barn.

Parker continued her work as a curator for the Found exhibition for The Foundling Museum, which incorporated sixty-eight artists from an array of creative disciplines, as well as contributing her own piece, A Little Drop of Gin. This limited-edition print, nicknamed 'mother's ruin', was a photogravure using a 1750s gin glass and droppings of gin. Parker was named Artist of the Year in the 2016 Apollo Awards for her involvement and contributions in the art world.

Parker appeared in the BBC Four television series What Do Artists Do All Day?, a BBC Scotland production, first broadcast in 2013. In the programme she talks about her life and work. In May 2015, Parker was included in the Brilliant Ideas series broadcast by Bloomberg TV in which she reveals her inspirations and discusses some of her best-loved works. In summer 2016, BBC One broadcast "Danger! Cornelia Parker" as part of the TV series Imagine. In autumn 2016 she was included in Gaga for Dada, a programme to mark the 100th anniversary of Dada, presented by Vic Reeves. She also contributed to the BBC Four production Bricks! broadcast on 21 September 2016, marking the 40th anniversary of Carl Andre's sculpture Equivalent VIII, better known as 'The Tate Bricks'.

On 1 May 2017 Parker was chosen as the official election artist for the 2017 United Kingdom general election; she was the first woman in that job.

In 2017, Parker made a series of blackboard drawings with the collaboration of 5-10 year-old schoolchildren from Torriano Primary School. The children were asked by the artist to copy out news headlines collected from various UK and US newspapers. 'At that age, children have a barely formed view of the news and world affairs - they don't yet have a vote, but the political turmoil unfolding in their young lives will have a profound effect on their futures'.

In November 2019 Parker opened her first major retrospective exhibition in Australia at the Museum of Contemporary Art, Sydney for the Tenth Sydney International Art Series, featuring over 40 artworks spanning the artists' career.

Curatorial
In 2011 Parker curated an exhibition titled Richard Of York Gave Battle In Vain for the Collections Gallery at the Whitechapel Gallery in London using selected works from the Government Art Collection arranged as a colour spectrum.

For the Royal Academy Summer Exhibition in 2014, Parker curated the Black and White Room which included a number of well-known artists who she thought should be future Royal Academicians.

In 2016, as part of her Hogarth Fellowship at the Foundling Museum, Parker curated a group exhibition titled FOUND presenting works from over sixty artists from a range of creative disciplines, asked to respond to the theme of ‘found’, reflecting on the Museum's heritage.

Honours and recognition
In 2010 Parker was elected to the Royal Academy of Arts, London and appointed Officer of the Order of the British Empire (OBE) in the 2010 Birthday Honours. In 2000, 2005 and 2008 she received Honorary Doctorates from the Universities of Wolverhampton, Birmingham, and Gloucestershire respectively.

Parker won the Artist of the Year Apollo Award in 2016. Other shortlisted artists were Carmen Herrera, David Hockney, Ragnar Kjartansson, Jannis Kounellis and Helen Marten.

Parker was named as the official Election Artist for the 2017 general election in the United Kingdom. In this role she observed the election campaign leading up to the vote on 8 June, and was required to produce a piece of art in response. Parker created two films and a series of 14 photographic works as a result of this commission, which were previewed on BBC Newsnight on 2 February 2018 and made available online via the UK Parliament website. prior to an exhibition in Westminster Hall.

She was appointed Commander of the Order of the British Empire (CBE) in the 2022 Birthday Honours for services to the arts.

Politics
In politics, prior to the 2015 general election, she was one of several celebrities who endorsed the parliamentary candidacy of the Green Party's Caroline Lucas.

See also
 British Art
 Book Works
 What Do Artists Do All Day?

References

External links

 Tate: Cold Dark Matter: An Exploded View
 Tate: Cornelia Parker: Talking Art Cornelia Parker interviewed by writer and curator Lisa LeFeuvre. May 31, 2008
 Tateshots: Cornelia Parker's 'Folkestone Mermaid' The artist talks about her work for Folkestone Triennial 2011. June 23, 2011
 Sculptor and Artist Cornelia Parker (video)

1956 births
Living people
20th-century British sculptors
21st-century British sculptors
20th-century English women artists
21st-century English women artists
Academics of Camberwell College of Arts
Alumni of the University of Reading
Alumni of the University of Wolverhampton
British conceptual artists
Commanders of the Order of the British Empire
English contemporary artists
English expatriates in Switzerland
English installation artists
English women sculptors
Academic staff of European Graduate School
People from Cheshire
Royal Academicians
Women conceptual artists
Women installation artists
British embroiderers